Cleveland Stars may refer to:

Baseball
 Cleveland Stars (baseball), Negro league baseball team in the East-West League in 1932
 Cleveland Tate Stars, Negro league baseball team in the Negro National League in 1922

Soccer
 Cleveland Stars (1972–73), American Soccer League team known as the Cobras after 1973
 Cleveland City Stars, United Soccer Leagues First Division team from 2006 to 2009